Chryseomicrobium aureum  is a Gram-positive, rod-shaped, aerobic non-spore-forming and non-motile bacterium from the genus of Chryseomicrobium which has been isolated from activated sludge from a herbicide-manufacturing wastewater treatment plant in Kunshan in China.

References

External links
Type strain of Chryseomicrobium aureum at BacDive -  the Bacterial Diversity Metadatabase

Bacillales
Bacteria described in 2014